John Hicks is an album led by the eponymous pianist, recorded in 1982.

Recording and music
The album was recorded at Different Fur Studios, San Francisco, in May 1982. "This album has four trio numbers with vibraphonist Bobby Hutcherson and bassist Walter Booker, a trio of unaccompanied piano solos, and a piano duet version of the leader's 'After the Morning' which teams Hicks with his wife Olympia."

Releases
John Hicks was released by Theresa Records. It was reissued by Evidence Records with "Beantown Blues", also from May 1982, added.

Track listing

Original release
"Pas De Trois (Dance for Three)"
"Steadfast"
"For John Chapman"
"Star-Crossed Lovers"
"Littlest One of All"
"After the Morning"
"That Ole Devil Called Love"
"Gypsy Folk Tales"

Reissue
For the reissue, one track was added to the eight on the original album:

"Beantown Blues"

Personnel
John Hicks – piano
Bobby Hutcherson – vibraphone (tracks 1, 3, 5, 8)
Olympia Hicks – piano (tracks 6, 9)
Walter Booker – bass (tracks 1, 3, 5, 8)
Idris Muhammad – drums (track 9)

References

John Hicks (jazz pianist) albums
Theresa Records albums